"Heaven Must Be Missing an Angel" is a song by German pop group Bro'Sis. It was written by Dane Deviller, Sean Hossein, and René Tromborg and Rasmus Bille Bahncke from songwriting team Supaflyas and produced by D-Fact, Frank Lio, N-Deefor under their production moniker Syndicate for the band's debut studio album Never Forget (Where You Come From) (2002). The song was released as the album's third single and became the band's third consecutive top ten hit in Germany.

Formats and track listings

Credits and personnel 

 Ross Antony – vocals
 Hila Bronstein – vocals
 Shaham Joyce – vocals
 Achim "Frank Lio" Kleist – production
 Andy "N-Dee" Lutschounig – production

 Faiz Mangat – vocals
 Wolfgang "D-Fact" Webenau – production
 Indira Weis – vocals
 Giovanni Zarrella – vocals

Charts

Weekly charts

References 

2002 songs
Bro'Sis songs
Polydor Records singles
Songs written by Sean Hosein
Songs written by Dane Deviller
Songs written by Rasmus Bille Bahncke